The 2002–03 Serie A (known as the Serie A TIM for sponsorship reasons) was the 101st season of top-tier Italian football, the 71st in a round-robin tournament. It was composed by 18 teams, for the 15th consecutive time from season 1988–89.

The first two teams qualified directly to UEFA Champions League. Teams finishing in third and fourth position had to play Champions League qualifications. Teams finishing in fifth and sixth positions qualified to UEFA Cup (another spot was given to the winner of Coppa Italia). The bottom four teams were to be relegated in Serie B.

Juventus won its 27th national title, with Internazionale placing second and Milan third. Lazio was admitted to the UEFA Champions League preliminary phase, whereas Parma, Udinese and Roma (through the Coppa Italia finals) obtained a spot to the next UEFA Cup. Brescia and Perugia were admitted to participate in the UEFA Intertoto Cup, after Chievo declined to participate.

Piacenza, Torino, Como and Atalanta were relegated to Serie B, with the latter after having lost a relegation play-off against Reggina.

Rule changes
Unlike La Liga, which imposed a quota on the number of non-EU players on each club, Serie A clubs could sign as many non-EU players as available on domestic transfer. But for the 2003–04 season a quota was imposed on each of the clubs limiting the number of non-EU, non-EFTA and non-Swiss players who may be signed from abroad each season, following provisional measures introduced in the 2002–03 season, which allowed Serie A & B clubs to sign only one non-EU player in the 2002 summer transfer window.

Managerial changes

Personnel and sponsoring 

(*) Promoted from Serie B.

League table

Results

Overall
Most wins - Juventus  (21)
Fewest wins - Como and Torino (4)
Most draws -  Lazio and Brescia (15)
Fewest draws - Piacenza (6)
Most losses - Torino (21)
Fewest losses - Juventus and Lazio (4)
Most goals scored - Juventus and Internazionale (64)
Fewest goals scored - Torino (23)
Most goals conceded - Piacenza (62)
Fewest goals conceded - Juventus (29)

Relegation tie-breaker

Reggina won 2 – 1 on aggregate.

Atalanta relegated to Serie B.

Top goalscorers

Number of teams by region

Transfer
Summer Transfer
Winter Transfer
co-ownership
co-ownership

References and sources

Almanacco Illustrato del Calcio - La Storia 1898-2004, Panini Edizioni, Modena, September 2005

External links
 :it:Classifica calcio Serie A italiana 2003 - Italian version with pictures and info.
  - All results on RSSSF Website.
 2002/2003 Serie A Squads - (www.footballsquads.com)

Serie A seasons
Italy
1